Jessore Polytechnic Institute (JPI) is a public polytechnic institute located in Jessore, Bangladesh. It is one of the biggest and oldest polytechnic institutes in Bangladesh.

History 
In 1964 it was established on 15 acres of land. Initially, there was a system of teaching both technical and technical disciplines, but in 1969–70, the teaching of mechanical, technology was introduced. Later, it was joined with electrical, electronic, computer and telecommunication technology. On 30 January 2006, the institute saw fractional clashes between activists of Bangladesh Jatiotabadi Chatra Dal activists. On 15 May 2012, the institute was closed flowing vandalism by activists of Bangladesh Chattra League.

References

External links 

 

Polytechnic institutes in Khulna Division
Educational institutions established in 1964
1960s establishments in East Pakistan